is a 2003
Japanese film by director Isshin Inudo. The film is based on a Japanese short story of the same name by Seiko Tanabe.

Plot
Tsuneo Suzukawa is a university student enjoying an easy-going lifestyle while working part-time at a mah-jong parlour. While walking his boss' dog, he sees a pram roll down a hill and collide with a traffic barrier. The owner of the pram, an elderly woman, asks him to check to see if her granddaughter is safe. Upon inspecting the pram, Tsuneo finds the occupant is not a baby, but a young woman named Kumiko wielding a kitchen knife. Tsuneo accompanies Kumiko and her grandmother back to their home, where Kumiko cooks them a meal. Kumiko's grandmother tells Tsuneo that she regularly takes her granddaughter out for early morning walks in the pram as Kumiko cannot walk due to a disability, a fact her grandmother conceals from their neighbours. Tsuneo, fascinated by Kumiko and her strong willed personality, begins to visit regularly and the two become friends. During one of his later visits, Tsuneo asks Kumiko what her name is, despite already knowing from their first encounter. She tells him her name is Josee, after a character from her favourite book, and he begins referring to her as such.

At university, Tsuneo meets Kanae, a fellow student studying social care. Tsuneo asks her for advice on how to help Josee and her grandmother apply for welfare and soon after the two start dating.

After modifying the pram by attaching it to a skateboard, Tsuneo persuades Josee to sneak out while her grandmother is asleep and the two ride around the city. Upon their return, Josee's grandmother becomes angry at the risk they took and tells Tsuneo to leave. However, Tsuneo later manages to persuade her to apply for social welfare, allowing for their house to be renovated to make things easier for Josee. During the renovation, Josee finds out about Tsuneo and Kanae's relationship and becomes jealous. Josee's grandmother, wanting to protect Josee from heartbreak, tells Tsuneo to stop visiting once and for all. Tsuneo complies until a few days later, when during a job interview he discovers that Josee's grandmother has died. He abruptly leaves the interview to go see Josee. The two have tea together, where Josee informs Tsuneo that she is coping fine on her own. Tsuneo reacts with disgust after Josee tells him that one of her neighbours takes out her trash in exchange for letting him touch her breasts, and Josee angrily tells Tsuneo to get out. As Tsuneo goes to leave, Josee embraces him and asks him to stay with her forever, to which Tsuneo calmly agrees. They kiss and later have sex (6 days later). Shortly after Tsuneo moves into the house, Josee encounters Kanae who accuses her of using her disability to manipulate Tsuneo into a relationship. They have a brief altercation and Kanae walks away.

A year later, Tsuneo and Josee are happily living together. Tsuneo decides to take Josee home to attend a memorial service so his parents can meet her, borrowing a car from Josee's childhood friend Koji. They visit an aquarium along the way, but are disappointed to find it closed. After stopping at a rest area, Tsuneo changes his mind about the memorial and calls his younger brother to tell him he cannot make it home due to work, although his brother sees through his excuse and accuses him of chickening out. Tsuneo and Josee drive to a beach where Josee sees the ocean for the first time. They later spend the night at a love hotel, where Josee tells Tsuneo about how lonely her life had been before she met him.

A few months later, Josee and Tsuneo break up. After leaving their house for the last time, Tsuneo meets up with his ex-girlfriend Kanae and they walk together. As they make their way down the street, Tsuneo breaks down in tears as he realizes he will probably never see Josee again.

Cast
 Satoshi Tsumabuki as Tsuneo Suzukawa
 Chizuru Ikewaki as Josee
 Juri Ueno as Kanae
 Hirofumi Arai as Koji
 Eiko Shinya as Josee's grandmother
 Noriko Eguchi as Noriko
 Daigo Fujisawa as Ryuji

Awards
For the film, Inudō was given the Minister of Education New Director Award for Fine Art, and Satoshi Tsumabuki won best actor awards from Kinema Junpo and from the Hochi Film Awards. The film was selected as the fourth best Japanese film of the year in the Kinema Junpo poll of film critics.

References

External links
  
 
 Josee, the Tiger and the Fish at AllCinema.net 

2003 films
Japanese independent films
Japanese romantic drama films
Films based on Japanese novels
Films based on short fiction
Films directed by Isshin Inudo
Films set in Saitama Prefecture
Films set in Tokyo
2000s Japanese films